Arthur Bailey may refer to:

 Arthur Bailey (rower), Canadian rower 
 Arthur Bailey (footballer) (1914–2006), English footballer
 Arthur Scott Bailey (1877–1949), American writer